Moise Mugisha (born 1 January 1997) is a Rwandan cyclist, who currently rides for .

Major results

2018
 Africa Cup
2nd Team time trial
6th Time trial
 10th Overall Tour of Rwanda
2019
 1st  Time trial, African Under-23 Road Championships
 National Under-23 Road Championships
1st  Road race
2nd Time trial
 1st  Mountains classification Tour du Cameroun
 1st Stage 5 Tour de l'Espoir
 African Road Championships
2nd  Team time trial
8th Time trial
 African Games
3rd  Time trial
3rd  Team time trial
 4th Overall Tour du Faso
1st Stage 3
2020
 1st  Overall Grand Prix Chantal Biya
1st  Young rider classification
1st Stages 1 & 4
 2nd Overall Tour du Rwanda
2021
 African Road Championships
2nd  Team time trial
2nd  Mixed team relay
3rd  Time trial
2022
 1st Overall Tour du Cameroun
 Tour du Rwanda
1st  Mountains classification
1st Stage 8
2023
 African Road Championships
2nd  Time trial
3rd  Team time trial

References

External links
 

1997 births
Living people
Rwandan male cyclists
People from Musanze District
African Games bronze medalists for Rwanda
African Games medalists in cycling
Competitors at the 2019 African Games
Olympic cyclists of Rwanda
Cyclists at the 2020 Summer Olympics